Evander Holyfield vs. Mike Tyson II, billed as the Sound and the Fury and afterwards infamously referred to as The Bite Fight, was a professional boxing match contested between Evander Holyfield and Mike Tyson on June 28, 1997, for the WBA Heavyweight Championship. It achieved notoriety as one of the most bizarre fights in boxing history after Tyson bit off a part of Holyfield's ear. Tyson was disqualified from the match and lost his boxing license, though it was later reinstated.

The fight took place at the MGM Grand Garden Arena in Las Vegas, Nevada. The referee officiating the fight was Mills Lane, who was brought in as a late replacement when Tyson's camp protested the original selection of Mitch Halpern (who officiated the first fight) as the referee.

Background
Tyson and Holyfield had fought seven months earlier in Las Vegas. Tyson was making his first defense of the WBA championship he had won from Bruce Seldon in a first-round knockout. Holyfield, despite being a former champion, was a significant underdog entering the match as he had been rather lackluster in several fights since he returned to fighting in 1995 after a brief retirement. However, Holyfield surprised Tyson by controlling the contest and knocked him down in the sixth round. Halpern stopped the fight in the eleventh round, giving Holyfield an upset victory.

When the fight was signed, Halpern was again assigned to be the referee. Tyson's management objected, with the official reason being that they wanted a different referee for the rematch. It was believed, though never confirmed, that the actual reason why Tyson and crew objected to Halpern's assignment was that Holyfield had clashed heads with Tyson several times during the course of the first fight and Halpern ruled them all accidental. The Nevada State Athletic Commission ruled against the Tyson camp, but Halpern willingly withdrew from the fight days before because he felt his presence would be a distraction. The assignment was instead given to the veteran Lane, who had worked six previous fights featuring Tyson and seven featuring Holyfield.

Match

The match began with Holyfield dominating Tyson. Holyfield won the first three rounds. At 2:19 of the first round, an overhand right punch from Holyfield stunned Tyson, but Tyson fought back, immediately pushing Holyfield backwards. At 32 seconds into the second round, Holyfield ducked under a right punch from Tyson. In doing so, he head-butted Tyson, producing a large cut over the latter's right eye (although trainer Ritchie Giachetti believed the injury happened in the first round). Tyson had repeatedly complained about head-butting in the first bout between the two fighters. Upon reviewing replays, referee Mills Lane stated that the headbutts were unintentional and non-punishable.

As the third round was about to begin, Tyson came out of his corner without his mouthpiece. Lane ordered Tyson back to his corner to insert it. Tyson inserted his mouthpiece, got back into position, and the match resumed. Tyson began the third round with a furious attack. With forty seconds remaining in the round, Holyfield got Tyson in a clinch, and Tyson rolled his head above Holyfield's shoulder and bit Holyfield on his right ear. A one-inch piece of cartilage was torn from the top of Holyfield’s ear, which Tyson spat out onto the ring apron. 

Holyfield leapt into the air in pain and spun in a circle, bleeding profusely from the bite wound. Lane stopped the action, but Tyson managed to rush Holyfield from behind and shove him into his corner. Lane separated the men, moved Tyson to a neutral corner, and went back to check on an enraged Holyfield. The fight would be delayed for the next few minutes as Lane decided on what to do. 

Lane called Marc Ratner, the chairman of Nevada’s athletic commission, up
to the ring apron and informed him that because Tyson had bitten Holyfield’s ear, he was going to disqualify him and end the fight. Meanwhile, ringside physician Flip Homansky was performing his own check on the champion, and Lane decided to defer to him. Once Homansky cleared Holyfield to continue the fight, Lane decided to allow the bout to continue, but not before penalizing Tyson with a two-point deduction for the bite. As Lane explained the decision to Tyson and his cornermen, Tyson asserted that the injury to Holyfield's ear was the result of a punch. "Bullshit," Lane retorted.

During another clinch, Tyson bit Holyfield's left ear. Holyfield threw his hands around to escape the clinch and jumped back. Tyson's second bite just scarred Holyfield's ear. At the time of the second bite, Lane did not stop the match, and both combatants continued fighting until time expired. The men walked back to their respective corners, and when the second bite was discovered, the match was halted again.

Post-fight unrest
After the match was stopped, Tyson went on a rampage at Holyfield and his trainer Brooks while they were still in their corner. Lane told Tyson's corner that he was disqualifying Tyson for biting Holyfield. To protect Holyfield, security surrounded him in his corner, and Tyson was taken back to his corner by security. Lane was interviewed and said he knew from experience that the bites were intentional. He had told Tyson not to bite anymore, and said Tyson asked to be disqualified by disobeying that order. Holyfield left the ring seconds after the interview, which gave the fans and audience the hint that the match was over. Holyfield told the press afterward that Tyson bit him because he knew he was going to get knocked out, and he chose to lose in a disqualification instead.

Reporters then interviewed Tyson's instructor, who was upset about Lane's decision. The instructor said, "They will have to explain that. I do not agree with it but it is what it is...all I know is Mike Tyson has a cut in his eye."

Twenty-five minutes after the brawl ended, announcer Jimmy Lennon Jr. read the decision: "Ladies and gentlemen, this bout has been stopped at the end of round number three. The referee in charge, Mills Lane, disqualifies Mike Tyson for biting Evander Holyfield in both ears, the winner by way of disqualification and still the WBA Champion of the world, Evander 'the Real Deal' Holyfield!" As a result, Holyfield remained the WBA Heavyweight champion.

Tyson later remarked that his bites were in retaliation for the headbutts from Holyfield.

Later, during post-match interviews, Tyson was walking back to his locker room when a fan from the venue tossed a bottle of water in his direction. Tyson, his instructor, and a pain manager climbed over a temporary railing and up into the stands, made obscene gestures to the crowd, and made their way up the side of a stairway. Tyson had to be restrained as he was led off. When interviewed about his championship and the incident with Tyson, Holyfield said he already forgave Tyson for biting him.

The commentators for the Sky Sports broadcast of the bout, Ian Darke and Glenn McCrory, noted that no one had been disqualified in a title bout for more than 50 years, correctly estimating that the last disqualification was during a bout between Joe Louis and Buddy Baer in 1941, where Baer was disqualified after his manager refused to leave the ring. They also compared the match to The Long Count Fight and the Phantom Punch incident.

Aftermath
As a result of biting Holyfield on both ears and other behavior, Tyson's boxing license was revoked by the Nevada State Athletic Commission and he was fined $3 million plus legal fees. On appeal, the commission voted 4–1 to reinstate Tyson's license on October 18, 1998. 

After both men retired from boxing, they became close friends.

In the 2008 documentary Tyson, the boxer claimed he did it as retaliation for the headbutting.

On October 16, 2009, on The Oprah Winfrey Show, Tyson made amends with Holyfield, telling him "it's been a pleasure passing through life, being acquainted with you." Holyfield accepted Tyson's overture and forgave him.

A book titled The Bite Fight was made in 2013 by journalist George Willis, illustrating the lives of Tyson and Holyfield before, during, and after the fight. The fight was also examined from the perspective of both boxers in the 30 for 30 documentary Chasing Tyson.

In 2022, Tyson and Holyfield teamed up to produce edible cannabis sweets in the shape of Holyfield's ear, called 'Holy Ears' also creating a comedic Christmas advert to promote the product.

See also
 Mike Tyson vs. Evander Holyfield

References

World Boxing Association heavyweight championship matches
1997 in boxing
Boxing in Las Vegas
Boxing on Showtime
1997 in sports in Nevada
History of boxing
Violence in sports
Tyson 2
Holyfield 2
June 1997 sports events in the United States
MGM Grand Garden Arena
Combat sports controversies
Sports controversies
Nicknamed sporting events